Rivand Rural District is a rural district (dehestan) in the Central District of Nishapur County, Razavi Khorasan province, Iran. At the 2006 census, its population was 12,619, in 3,301 families.  The rural district has 59 villages.

References 

Rural Districts of Razavi Khorasan Province
Nishapur County